90 Days, Time to Love is a 2006 South Korean television series starring Kang Ji-hwan, Kim Ha-neul, Jung Hye-young and Yoon Hee-seok. It aired on MBC from November 15, 2006, to January 4, 2007, on Wednesdays and Thursdays at 21:55 (KST) for 16 episodes.

Plot
Hyun Ji-seok (Kang Ji-hwan), a university professor, and Go Mi-yeon (Kim Ha-neul), a scriptwriter, were high school sweethearts, who discover that they are cousins. They break up, but find themselves attracted to one other once again when they meet in Seoul four years later. They decide to abandon everything else and leave for America so that they can get married. However, Ji-seok's father finds out and runs in front of a truck, committing suicide, so that his son doesn't go. Their visas had just been issued, but Ji-seok cannot marry Mi-yeon knowing that it was the cause of his father's death. He abandons Mi-yeon and marries Park Jeong-ran (Jung Hye-young), the daughter of his father's business rival, who is in love with him.  They have a daughter, but their marriage is loveless. Mi-yeon goes on to marry another man, Kim Tae-hoon (Yoon Hee-seok).

Nine years later, when Ji-seok learns that he is terminally ill and has only 90 days left to live, he looks for Mi-yeon and asks her to spend the last few days of his life with him.

Cast

Main
 Kang Ji-hwan as Hyun Ji-seok
 Kim Ha-neul as Go Mi-yeon
 Jung Hye-young as Park Jeong-ran 
 Yoon Hee-seok as Kim Tae-hoon

Supporting
 Kim Hyung-bum as Park Deok-goo, Ji-seok's friend
 Yoon Hyun-sook as Kim Wal-sook, Mi-yeon's friend
 Choi Sung-ho as Boo Byung-chan, Ji-seok's friend
 Ha Jae-young as Mi-yeon's father
 Kim Hye-ok as Ji-seok's mother
 Lee Jae-yong as Ji-seok's father
 Lee Jang-woo as Mi-yeon's classmate

International broadcast
It aired on Japanese cable channel BS Japan in June 2008.

In Thailand first aired on Channel 3 everyday beginning March 18, 2009, to April 21, 2009.

References

External links
90 Days, Time to Love official MBC website 
90 Days, Time to Love at MBC Global Media

MBC TV television dramas
2006 South Korean television series debuts
2007 South Korean television series endings
Korean-language television shows
South Korean romance television series
South Korean melodrama television series
Television series by Chorokbaem Media